1967 is a compilation album released by the Mint 400 Records label. It is the label's sixth compilation, and features songs that were written or made popular in the year 1967.

Content
The fourteen-track album was released by Mint 400 Records for free on 30 March 2015, and showcases the Duke of Norfolk, Fairmont, Fawn and Rabbit, Jack Skuller, the Maravines, Moscow Centre, Murzik, the One & Nines, Netorare Fan Club, Tri-State and Zach Uncles. In a Pirate! press release, the staff writer notes "the majority of bands on Mint 400 Records have a strong 60's influence and 1967 seemed like the year that was most important." The album contains songs that were written or recorded during 1967, the second compilation from Mint 400 Records which features music from that era, the previous being the Beach Boys' Pet Sounds compilation. 

On recording for the compilation, Jack Skuller explains "I have always been drawn to the dark and deep yet simplistic poetry of the Doors. I collaborated with Neil Sabatino on the arrangement. My goal when recording "Love Me Two Times" was to explore the blues element in the Doors' writing." For his cover of "The Song Of Seeonee," a song removed from Disney's animated film The Jungle Book because it was deemed "too dark," Adam Howard of the Duke of Norfolk says "it may at first seem incongruous to throw a Disney song in the mix with bunch of influential 60's rock but, considering the influence of the music of Disney's films, I think it’s actually quite fitting."

Summarizing the compilation in a review for The Pop Break, columnist Shannon Moore concludes "depending on where the listener stands it could be considered either blasphemy to touch these tracks, or beating a dead horse who never had much life to begin with," and further adds "while not every moment on 1967 is perfect, each artist puts their respective covers through a unique prism, making for some imaginative and enjoyable results."

Track listing

See also
1967 in music

References

Citations

Bibliography

2015 compilation albums
Mint 400 Records albums
Record label compilation albums